"Clarifications" is the eighth episode of the fifth season of the HBO original series The Wire. The episode was written by Dennis Lehane from a story by David Simon and Dennis Lehane and was directed by Anthony Hemingway. It aired on February 24, 2008.

Plot
Michael informs Partlow and Snoop about his confrontation with Omar. Soon afterwards, Omar goes to a corner store to buy cigarettes and is shot to death by a street kid named Kenard. At a COMSTAT meeting, McNulty updates his superiors and Mayor Carcetti on the "serial killer" case. Carcetti approves McNulty's request to let Carver join the investigation. Carver questions why McNulty picked him over a sergeant from the district where the murders occurred, and guesses that Freamon is running a wiretap. While Carver assembles surveillance teams, McNulty helps Bunk take a request for DNA matching to the crime lab.

McNulty arrives home to find that Beadie has left a note saying she is not sure when she and her children will return. When McNulty and Greggs travel to Quantico, Virginia, to get FBI assistance, he is disturbed when the Bureau's psychological profile reflects his own personality. Back in Baltimore, Bunk finds himself investigating Omar's murder and realizes from a hit list that he was hunting Marlo's crew, with Savino's name the only one crossed out. Bunk delivers the list to McNulty, and reluctantly agrees to hold back on a murder warrant for Partlow so that Freamon can make a break in the Stanfield investigation. McNulty pulls Greggs into an interview room and comes clean about fabricating the case. Greggs tells McNulty he cannot carry on with his plan, but McNulty tries to reassure her that it will all be over soon. Beadie eventually returns with her children and confronts McNulty, prompting him to confess to her as well. She walks away from the conversation in anger. Freamon intercepts a coded message from Marlo to organize a meeting with Partlow.

Freamon meets with the U.S. Attorney with the evidence from the Davis investigation, hoping to take the case federal now that local prosecution has failed. The U.S. Attorney refuses to take the case, since Davis is now a martyr to the black community.

When McNulty hands Freamon Omar's hit list, he recognizes Cheese's name. McNulty admits that he has told Greggs about the hoax, much to Freamon's dismay. While tracking Marlo, Sydnor pulls out a street atlas and realizes that the page numbers correspond to the clock messages. He then decodes the clock settings as codes for the Cartesian coordinates of the location on each indicated page.

Freamon tracks Davis to a bar and threatens him with the prospect of a new case at the federal level. Davis assumes Freamon is trying to blackmail him for money, to which Freamon instead demands answers. Freamon returns to the office to find that Sydnor has cracked the code. Sydnor is perplexed that the code gives only a location and not a time to meet, and Freamon postulates that the meetings are to happen within an hour. Freamon makes a connection between the messages and guesses that Cheese is involved in the East Side meetings. Greggs arrives and chastises Freamon for his involvement in the hoax, saying that she is not good with the plan. Elsewhere, Dukie goes into a sporting goods store to seek a job and is told he is too young. Dukie recognizes the clerk as Malik "Poot" Carr, who recommends that Dukie go back to the street for a while and then apply for a job when he is older. Dukie leaves the store and helps a junk man. Dukie is offered more work the next day.

To deflect from his weakness on crime in the upcoming campaign, Mayor Carcetti and Steintorf decide to use the serial killings to attack the governor for cutting funds to homeless programs. Wilson learns that the mayor is facing a primary challenger named Dobey. Carcetti and Wilson drive to Prince George's County to persuade Congressman Upshaw, who is considering supporting Dobey, to remain in his camp. He then meets with Senator Davis and Campbell and makes concessions to them in exchange for their support. At a homeless vigil, Carcetti gives a rousing speech as Campbell, Wilson and Steintorf look on approvingly. Upon returning home, he complains to his wife Jen about the compromises he has been forced to make, revealing that Upshaw demanded that half of Baltimore's federal funding be allocated to his county. Jen is horrified at the prospect of the city giving up that much funding, but Carcetti rationalizes that if he does not get elected, Baltimore will get nothing.

At The Baltimore Sun, Gus arranges a face-to-face meeting between Templeton and Terry, who angrily accuses the former of falsifying their discussion. Templeton is unable to respond when Hanning asks what would happen if one of the Marines he served with had read the story and noticed the fabrication. Afterwards, Gus informs Templeton that they will investigate the complaint and attribute it to a misunderstanding, but that a correction will be printed if more details are found to be incorrect. Gus, intrigued by Fletcher's story about Bubbles, asks Fletcher to see what comes of spending more time with him. He cuts the lede from Templeton's story on the homeless vigil for including an unsourced anecdote. Templeton angrily turns to Klebanow, who overrides Gus's decision. Gus then leaves the newsroom.

Production

Title reference

The title refers to Haynes telling Templeton that he may have to submit a clarifications and corrections piece for Templeton's embellishing of Hanning's story. It may also refer to McNulty coming clean about his ruse. Additionally, the title refers to the mixed up identity tags on the bodies of Omar Little and the middle aged white man in the body bag next to his. The morgue attendant rectifies this by switching them back.

Epigraph

Homeless Marine veteran Terry Hanning says this as a rebuttal to journalist Scott Templeton while they're arguing, cutting each other off, and Templeton wants to tell "[his] side of the story."

Credits

Starring cast
Although credited, Deirdre Lovejoy, Andre Royo, Domenick Lombardozzi, and Michael Kostroff do not appear in this episode.

Guest stars

Amy Ryan as Beatrice "Beadie" Russell
Tray Chaney as Malik "Poot" Carr
Felicia Pearson as Felicia "Snoop" Pearson
Marlyne Afflack as Nerese Campbell
Megan Anderson as Jen Carcetti
Benay Berger as Amanda Reese
Doug Olear as Terrance "Fitz" Fitzhugh
Joseph Urla as Maryland District US Attorney
David Costabile as Thomas Klebanow
Todd Scofield as Jeff Price
Brandon Young as Mike Fletcher
Michael Stone Forrest as Frank Barlow
Ed Norris as Ed Norris
Gregory L. Williams as Michael Crutchfield
Bobby Brown as Bobby Brown
Rick Otto as Kenneth Dozerman
Ryan Sands as Lloyd "Truck" Garrick
Dave Ettlin as Dave Ettlin
Donald Neal as Jay Spry
Robert Poletick as Steven Luxenberg
David Goodman as Budget Advisor
Robert G. McKay as Congressman Albert Upshaw
William F. Zorzi as Bill Zorzi
Connor Aikin as Jack Russell
Keenon Brice as Aaron "Bug" Manigault
Aubrey Deeker as Terry Hanning
Thuliso Dingwall as Kenard
Reggie A. Green as Arabber
Amy Lee as Store Clerk
Russ Widdall as Ron Lowenthal
Curt Boushell as Andy
Joe Inscoe as Deputy Director Arthur Tolan
William Johnson as FBI Agent
Paul Morella as FBI Profiler
Dennis Hill as Detective Christeson
Melody Williams as Woman at crime scene #1
Melvina Williams as Woman at crime scene #2
Mary Beth Wise as Karen
Jim Ancel as unknown
Leroy Graves Jr. as unknown

Uncredited appearances
Kwame Patterson as Monk Metcalf
Jason Moffett as Tony – surveillance team
Brian E. McLarney as Brian McLarney – surveillance team
Marcus Hamm as Marcus – surveillance team
Sophia Ayoud as Cary Russell
Jimothy Jones as a henchman

References

External links
"Clarifications" at HBO.com

The Wire (season 5) episodes
2008 American television episodes